Aleksander Boliyan (born 27 July 1989) is a Turkmen international footballer. He is currently playing for Balkan FK, and plays on the Turkmenistan national football team.

Club career
Aleksander Boliyan played his first match for Şagadam Türkmenbaşy when he was 16. In his first season for club (2006) he scored 5 goals, then 1 goal in 2007, (unknown number in 2008) and 2 goals in 2009. In 2010 season he became his club's top goalscorer with 5 goals. Next season he moved to FC Ahal (6 goals), but later at summer transfer window he returned to Şagadam. 2012 season was his best season at Şagadam – he scored 23 goals and became League topscorer. From 2015 season player of FK Dinamo Samarqand.

Career statistics

International

Statistics accurate as of match played 24 May 2014

International goals

References

1989 births
Living people
Turkmenistan footballers
Turkmenistan expatriate footballers
Turkmenistan international footballers
Association football forwards
People from Türkmenbaşy
Turkmenistan people of Armenian descent
Turkmenistan expatriate sportspeople in Uzbekistan
Expatriate footballers in Uzbekistan
Footballers at the 2010 Asian Games
Asian Games competitors for Turkmenistan